Black Abyss (born December 20, 1972, in Mexicali Bc, México ) is a Mexican professional wrestler best known for time as a rudo in Asistencia Asesoría y Administración (AAA).
He is currently working as Black Abyss or sometimes known as Abismo Negro II.

Professional wrestling career
Wrestled in the independent with an unknown gimmick until 1996 he was known to have work as Ángel Mensajero which he still uses today. His gimmick Nautilus came into AAA as part of their "Nueva Imagen" campaign as a tecnico. He didn't stick around too long though.

After doing an Abismo Negro knock off gimmick in the independents, he returned to AAA as Black Abyss and became a rudo for the first time in his wrestling career. The evil Vipers Revolucion promoted clone of Abismo Negro. The feud between Abismo Negro and Vipers Revolution never stayed on track because Abismo Negro had his issues making AAA TV tapings. Black Abyss continues as a member of the Vipers. During Abismo's summer of 2008 departure from the company, the Vipers as a group disappeared from television during long stretches of 2008 as well. Black Abyss disappeared from TV, then was brought back to TV when Abismo Negro returned. The two feuded thru the spring of 2009 until Abismo Negro's passing. Black Abyss has appeared only a couple times on TV since then, still as a rudo, but seemingly in limbo. Black Abyss has stated about continuing with the character to honor the memory of Abismo Negro, but AAA hasn't shown a lot of interest in using it on TV whenever the original hasn't been around. In October 2010 it was reported that Black Abyss had left AAA.

Championships and accomplishments
Other titles
DWA Championship (1 time)
X-LAW Tag Team Championship (1 time) - with Mr. Tempest

Luchas de Apuestas record

Notes

References

1972 births
Living people
Mexican male professional wrestlers
Masked wrestlers
People from Mexicali
Sportspeople from Mexicali